In the human body, the adductor longus is a skeletal muscle located in the thigh.  One of the adductor muscles of the hip, its main function is to adduct the thigh and it is innervated by the obturator nerve.  It forms the medial wall of the femoral triangle.

Structure
The adductor longus arises from the body of pubis inferior to pubic crest and lateral to pubic symphysis.

It lies ventrally on the adductor magnus, and near the femur, the adductor brevis is interposed between these two muscles.  Distally, the fibers of the adductor longus extend into the adductor canal.

It is inserted into the middle third of the medial lip of the linea aspera.

Innervation
As part of the medial compartment of the thigh, the adductor longus is innervated by the anterior division (sometimes the posterior division) of the obturator nerve. The obturator nerve exits via the anterior rami of the spinal cord from L2, L3, and L4.

Relations
The adductor longus is in relation by its anterior surface with the pubic portion of the fascia lata, and near its insertion with the femoral artery and vein.

By its posterior surface with the adductor brevis and magnus, the anterior branches of the obturator artery, vein, and nerves, and near its insertion with the profunda artery and vein.

By its outer border with the pectineus, and by the inner border with the gracilis.

Actions
Its main actions are to adduct and internally rotate the thigh; it can also produce some degree of flexion/anteversion.

Development
Adductor longus is derived from the myotome of spinal roots L2, L3, and L4.

Additional images

References

External links
 
 
 PTCentral

Hip adductors
Hip flexors
Thigh muscles
Medial compartment of thigh